Financial Navigator, Inc is a United States-based software company that develops accounting software targeting single family offices (SFO), multi-family offices (MFO), accounting firms, and high-net-worth individuals. The company was founded in 1983 and is headquartered in Mountain View, CA.

Company Profile 
Financial Navigator, Inc was founded in 1983 by brothers Ed and John Van Deman to service the accounting and financial reporting needs of the high-net-worth market, where very few comprehensive software packages existed at the time.

The company's primary product is Navigator, a financial management and reporting application for managing complex financial situations (such as those faced by the very wealthy, trust and estate managers, and CPAs, among others). Navigator is complemented by a suite of modules that extend the functionality of the main application, adding features such as consolidated reporting, performance measurement, brokerage and banking downloads, as well as check printing, among other features.

Products

Core Application
Navigator - The core application provides functionality such as investment and portfolio tracking (of everything from securities, to oil and gas, to antiques), financial statements, and financial reporting. The application uses a double-entry accounting system. The application supports the .OFX (Open Financial Exchange) file format standard. The application runs on Windows workstations and servers. The application can be deployed locally or as a hosted solution.

The first version was released in 1984 and upgrades have followed roughly every two years. The current version is 9.5, released in October 2011. Modules that extend the functionality of the program have been added over the years, such as the ability to link to bank and brokerage accounts as well as automatic updating of security prices.

Add-On Modules
ROI - ROI adds performance reporting for investments and portfolios that allows for risk adjusted benchmarking. ROI can measure performance by manager or individual investor.

Advanced Reports - Module that allows for the creation of reports that span multiple years and entities.

Portfolio View - Module that allows for automatically classifying portfolios by geography, capitalization, sector, industry and other criteria.

BrokerLink - Retrieves and imports brokerage data in to Navigator from online brokerage accounts.

BankLink - Retrieves and imports bank transaction from checking, savings, credit card, and bill payment services in to Financial Naviagtor. Supports .OFX, .QFX, and .QIF file formats.

CheckForm - Print checks, including MICR codes, on to blank check stock.

StockWeb - Updates current stock prices and dividends over the internet and conduct research over the web.

PriceLink - Module that can retrieve and update historical prices in a portfolio including bonds, warrants, and mutual funds.

Other Services
Navigator OneView - Hosted, managed service that provides data collection, portfolio tracking, and financial reporting to clients.

External links
 http://www.finnav.com

Companies based in Mountain View, California
Companies established in 1983
Software companies based in California
Software companies of the United States